Daniel Stefanovski (born 27 March 1996) is a Swiss-Macedonian professional kickboxer. He is the current SUPERKOMBAT Light Heavyweight Champion.

Kickboxing career
During the SUPERKOMBAT Dream event, Stefanovski fought Adelin Mihăilă for the inaugural SUPERKOMBAT Light Heavyweight title. He earned the chance to fight for the title, after winning a split decision against Imanol Rodríguez in a title eliminator fought in April 2017. Stefanovski won the SUPERKOMBAT title with a first round TKO of Adelin Mihăilă.

During the TTZ Fight Night, Stefanovski fought Sofiane Alilouche for the ISKA World Light Heavyweight K-1 title. He won the fight by a first round TKO. In his next fight, Stefanovski fought for the WKU World light-heavyweight title. He won the fight by a first round TKO.

During CWS Fight Night 06, Stefanovski fought Marco Baars for the CWS Light heavyweight title. He won the fight by a fourth round TKO.

Championships and accomplishments 
 CWS
 CWS Light Heavyweight Championship 

Dynamite Fighting Show 
Fight of the Night (One time) vs. Florin Lambagiu

 International Sport Karate Association
 ISKA World Light Heavyweight K-1 Rules Championship 

 Superkombat Fighting Championship
 SUPERKOMBAT Light Heavyweight Championship 

 World Kickboxing and Karate Union
 WKU World –79 kg/174 lb Championship  

 World Professional Kickboxing Council
 WPKC European –80 kg/176 lb Championship

Kickboxing record

|-
|-  style="background:#cfc;"
| 2021-11-01 || Win ||align=left| Taha Alami Marrouni || Superkombat Universe || Dubai, UAE || Decision (unanimous) || 3 || 3:00  
|-  style="background:#cfc;"
| 2019-12-14 || Win ||align=left| Marco Baars || CWS Fight Night 06 || Neu-Ulm, Germany || TKO (towel thrown) || 4 || 1:19  
|-
! style=background:white colspan=9 |
|-
|-  style="background:#cfc;"
| 2019-10-27 || Win ||align=left| Nikola Zorić || BPN Vol. 21 || Novi Sad, Serbia || TKO (towel thrown) || 2 || 2:58 
|-
|-  style="background:#fbb;"
| 2019-09-27 || Loss ||align=left| Florin Lambagiu || Dynamite Fighting Show 5: Team Moroșanu vs. Team Bonjasky || Piatra Neamț, Romania || Decision (unanimous) || 3 || 3:00  
|-
|-  style="background:#cfc;"
| 2019-06-15 || Win ||align=left| Janilson da Cruz || Gladiators Night || Dietikon, Switzerland || KO (right punch) || 1 || 1:45
|-
! style=background:white colspan=9 |
|-
|-  style="background:#cfc;"
| 2019-04-13 || Win ||align=left| Sofiane Alilouche || TTZ Fight Night || Zürich, Switzerland || TKO (corner stoppage) || 1 || 2:11 
|-
! style=background:white colspan=9 |
|-
|-  style="background:#cfc;"
| 2018-10-28 || Win ||align=left| Beni Osmanoski || Ready 4 War 7 || Schlieren, Switzerland || TKO (referee stoppage) || 1 || 2:52 
|-
|-  style="background:#fbb;"
| 2018-09-09 || Loss ||align=left| Yang Yu || Kunlun Fight 76 || Zhangqiu, China || Decision (unanimous)  || 3 || 3:00 
|-   
|-  style="background:#fbb;"
| 2018-05-31 || Loss ||align=left| Sher Mamazulunov || 2018 TatNeft Cup || Kazan, Russia || Decision || 3 || 3:00 
|-
|-  style="background:#cfc;"
| 2018-03-25 || Win ||align=left| Adelin Mihăilă || SUPERKOMBAT Dream || Bucharest, Romania || KO (punches) || 1 || 1:34 
|-
! style=background:white colspan=9 |
|-   
|-  style="background:#fbb;"
| 2017-12-14 || Loss ||align=left| Stanislavs Makarenko || 2017 TatNeft Cup || Kazan, Russia || Decision || 3 || 3:00 
|-
|-  style="background:#fbb;"
| 2017-07-10 || Loss ||align=left| Sem Braan || K-1 World GP 2017 Andy Hug Memorial, Semi Finals || Zug, Switzerland || Decision (unanimous) || 3 || 3:00 
|-
|-  style="background:#cfc;"
| 2017-05-06 || Win  ||align=left| Janilson da Cruz || SUPERKOMBAT World Grand Prix II 2017 || Madrid, Spain || TKO (referee stoppage/three knockdown rule) || 1 || 1:05
|-
|-  style="background:#cfc;"
| 2017-04-07 || Win  ||align=left| Imanol Rodríguez || SUPERKOMBAT World Grand Prix I 2017 || Bucharest, Romania || Decision (split) || 3 || 3:00 
|-
! style=background:white colspan=9 |
|-
|-  style="background:#cfc;"
| 2017-03-12 || Win ||align=left| Alex Filip || SUPERKOMBAT New Heroes 10 || Bucharest, Romania || TKO (referee stoppage) || 3 || 0:21 
|-
|-  style="background:#cfc;"
| 2016-11-12 || Win ||align=left| Bogdan Năstase || SUPERKOMBAT World Grand Prix 2016 Final || Bucharest, Romania || Decision (unanimous) || 3 || 3:00 
|-
|-  style="background:#cfc;"
| 2016-10-01 || Win ||align=left| Ionuț Șandur || SUPERKOMBAT World Grand Prix 2016 Final Elimination || Iași, Romania || TKO (referee stoppage/three knockdown rule) || 3 || 2:41
|-
|-  style="background:#fbb;"
| 2016-09-24 || Loss ||align=left| Mustafa Genç || Casino Thai Fight || Baden, Switzerland || Decision (unanimous) || 5 || 3:00
|-
! style=background:white colspan=9 |
|- 
|-  style="background:#cfc;"
| 2016-06-25 || Win ||align=left| Efe Sipahi || Ready 4 War 6 || Zürich, Switzerland || KO (jumping knee) || 1 || 2:55
|- 
|-  style="background:#cfc;"
| 2016-05-28 || Win ||align=left| Kevin Buser || AFC 3 || Aarau, Switzerland || KO (punches) || 3 || 0:15
|-
|-  style="background:#cfc;"
| 2016-02-27 || Win  ||align=left| Mehmet Balık || Illyrian Fight Night || Winterthur, Switzerland || TKO (towel thrown) || 4 || 1:50
|-
! style=background:white colspan=9 |
|-  
|-  style="background:#fbb;"
| 2015-10 || Loss ||align=left| Selahattin Şahin || || || Decision (split) || 5 || 3:00
|-  style="background:#cfc;"
| 2015-10-03 || Win ||align=left| Levent Liechti || Fight4Glory IV || Reinach, Switzerland || Decision || 5 || 3:00
|-  
|-  style="background:#cfc;"
| 2014-09-13 || Win ||align=left| Aleksandar Vuruna || Gladiators Night || Baden, Switzerland || KO (knee to the head) || 2 || 2:33
|-  
|-  style="background:#cfc;"
| 2012-09-08 || Win ||align=left| Simon Walter || Prestige Fight Night || Baden, Switzerland || Decision (split) || 3 || 3:00
|-
|-
| colspan=9 | Legend:

See also 
List of male kickboxers

References

External links
 Official Dynamite Fighting Show profile 

1996 births
Living people
Sportspeople from Zürich
Swiss male kickboxers 
Macedonian male kickboxers 
Middleweight kickboxers 
SUPERKOMBAT kickboxers
Kunlun Fight kickboxers
Swiss people of Macedonian descent
Swiss Christians